The 1996 Bartercard Indycar Australia was the third round of the 1996 CART World Series season, held on 31 March 1996 on the Surfers Paradise Street Circuit, Surfers Paradise, Australia.

Qualifying results

Race

Notes 

 Average Speed 90.218 mph

External links
 Full Weekend Times & Results

Bartercard Indycar Australia
Bartercard Indycar Australia
Gold Coast Indy 300